Christine Jennifer Peng-Peng Lee (born June 27, 1993) is a retired Canadian artistic gymnast.  She was a member of the Canadian team that qualified for the 2012 Summer Olympics and committed to attend UCLA after the Olympics, where she led UCLA to a comeback win at the 2018 NCAA National Championship. Lee prefers using her Chinese name, Peng Peng, when doing gymnastics and she claims that it makes her feel like "someone completely different."

Junior career

2007 
In May, Lee competed at the Canadian Championships in Regina, Saskatchewan. She placed second in the all around finals with a score of 57.400. and second in balance beam event finals with a score of 15.55.

In November, Lee competed at the Junior Pan American Championships in Guatemala City, Guatemala.  The Canadian team won the silver medal with Lee earning 58.017, the highest score out of the Canadian gymnasts, placing her fourth in the all around competition. In the event finals she earned the silver medal on vault with a score of 13.700 and floor with a score of 14.450.  Lee also placed fourth on uneven bars with a score of 13.825 and sixth on balance beam with a score of 13.150.

In December, Lee competed at Elite Canada in Abbotsford, British Columbia. She placed second in the all around competition with a score of 56.150.  In event finals, Lee won floor scoring 14.75 and placed third on both uneven bars and balance beam scoring 14.20 and 14.35 respectively.

2008 
In March, Lee participated in the Pacific Rim Championships in San Jose, United States.  The Canadian team earned a silver medal and Lee placed fifth in the all around competition scoring 57.375.  In the event finals, she earned a silver medal on uneven bars scoring 14.925 and placed fourth on floor scoring 14.575.

In June, Lee placed third in the all around final of the Canadian Championships in Calgary, Alberta with a score of 56.200.  In event finals, she placed first on balance beam scoring 15.850, first on floor scoring 14.900, and fifth on uneven bars scoring 14.250.

Lee was diagnosed with spondylolisthesis and spondylolysis in the L5 vertebrae and took a two year hiatus from gymnastics to allow her back to heal.  She said, "The decision to return to gymnastics was hard because I wasn't sure if I would be able to do gymnastics again.  I didn't want to injure my back any further and when they told me if I continued and my back was not stable, there was a chance of my spine hitting a nerve so that terrified me.  I knew I always wanted to come back and my goals ultimately drew me back into the sport."

Senior career

2010 
In December, Lee returned to gymnastics at Elite Canada in Quebec, Canada.  She won the all around competition with a score of 54.800.  In event finals, Lee placed second on floor scoring 13.850, second on balance beam scoring 14.250, and eighth on uneven bars scoring 11.000.

2011 
At the end of March, Lee competed at the Artistic Gymnastics World Cup in Doha, Qatar.  She placed fifth in the uneven bars final with a score of 11.900, sixth in the balance beam final with a score of 12.250, and fifth in the floor final with a score of 13.100.

In October, Lee was a member of the Canadian team at the 2011 World Artistic Gymnastics Championships in Tokyo, Japan.  They placed eleventh in the team competition which meant that they would have to compete in London in January in order to qualify a full team for the Olympics.  In qualifications, Lee was the top Canadian gymnast with an all around score of 54.632 and placed nineteenth in the all around final scoring 54.732. Lee told International Gymnast Magazine, "I thought qualifications went well, but there are still improvements I would like to make. I am really focusing on the process of my routines, like taking it one skill at a time. The results will come afterwards."

Later in October, Lee was a member of the Canadian team that won the silver medal at the 2011 Pan American Games in Guadalajara, Mexico.  She was Canada's highest scoring team member, contributing a score of 55.325 which qualified her in second place for the all around competition but she only scored 54.575 in the finals placing her fourth behind team member Kristina Vaculik.  Lee ended the competition by placing fifth in the uneven bars final with a score of 13.575.

Lee's last competition of the year was the Mexican Gymnastics Open in December in Acapulco, Mexico.  She finished second in the individual all around scoring 55.500.  Lee was paired with Danell Leyva for the mixed pairs competition, which they won with a combined score of 144.850.

2012 
In January, Lee competed at the London Prepares series where Canada qualified a full team to the 2012 Summer Olympics.  She was the highest scoring member of the Canadian team contributing a 55.565 all around score. Lee then placed fifth in the uneven bars final scoring 14.366.

At the International Gymnix Challenge in Montreal, Canada on March 9, Lee won the all around competition with a score of 57.875.  She had the highest score on each apparatus except for vault.

At the Pacific Rim Championships in March, Lee helped Canada place third behind the USA and China followed by a bronze medal in the individual all around competition with a score of 57.800. In the event finals, Lee tied for fourth on uneven bars scoring 14.600 and earned silver medals on both balance beam and floor scoring 15.300 and 14.575 respectively. She told International Gymnast Magazine, "I was just trying to have a lot of fun and also was trying to get a little more experience competing my new routines.  My expectations weren't too too high."

In April, Lee won the uneven bars gold medal at the World Cup in Osijek, Croatia with a score of 14.475.  She also placed fourth in the balance beam final scoring 13.400 and the floor final scoring 13.375.

In May, Lee was set to compete at the Canadian Championships in Regina, Canada but she injured her knee practicing a double twisting Yurchenko vault during podium training before the competition.  "It's too early to speculate about whether Peng Peng can recover from this injury in time for the Olympics," said Jean-Paul Caron, president of Gymnastics Canada. "We are going to wait for the MRI results and hope for the best."

In June, Lee announced that she would be withdrawing from the Olympic selection process due to her torn anterior cruciate ligament.
To all my family, gym friends and fans,
The last couple of weeks have been very difficult due to my recent knee injury. I was informed that I had torn my ACL and was devastated because I’ve committed such a huge part of my life to the sport. It happened at a very bad time and as you can imagine, the news was extremely hard to digest.
I have spent a great deal of time consulting with doctors and did a lot of soul searching to determine what was best for me. I have decided to withdraw from the selection process for the 2012 Olympic Games. I do not want to rush into doing gymnastics for the Olympics if my knee could be at a greater risk and possibly affect me in the future. I will be attending the Olympic Games to support Team Canada and will be cheering them at the top of my lungs!
I want to take this opportunity to thank my coaches, Gymnastics Canada, teammates and fans for all the love and support you have given me through this difficult time. I am truly honoured to be surrounded by such loving and supportive people. All of you have really helped lift my spirits with your kind words and well wishes. I’ve read every single message and have taken it to heart. I love you all!!!
I am really excited about continuing my gymnastics career at UCLA and becoming part of the Bruin Family. I still have the same passion and love for the sport and look forward to competing in the future.
Peng Peng Lee

At the end of June, Lee said, "My knee is doing really well. I have had lots of treatment on it, and the mobility is coming back much faster than I thought. I'm not quite sure when I will be able to train on it again. I am taking it day by day right now. Once I undergo surgery I will have a better understanding of when I can start training again and what rehab I should be doing."

In July, Lee travelled to London with the Canadian team to act as their captain at the 2012 Summer Olympics.  Before the Olympics she told International Gymnast Magazine, "I am so honored to be team captain and can't wait to be there with the team through their Olympic journey.  I want to make sure the team always stays positive and supportive with each other through this process, and that they enjoy the Olympics and stick together as a team. Also, I would like to pass on some of my experiences of being part of a team and handling different pressures that they may come across.  My teammates will be looking to me for advice and leadership.  As we get closer to the Olympic Games, the athletes and I will get more nervous and trainings will become more intense. I try to stay calm and always try to get everyone to stick together as a team because, during these pressures, having your team support you makes the experience more enjoyable. Everyone on the team is going after the same goals and dreams, and no one should feel isolated, because every member plays a substantial role. By having a positive attitude throughout the process and supporting one another, I think the team will do really well."  The Canadian team finish fifth in the team final which it the highest placement Canada has ever achieved.  The gymnasts wore white flowers in their hair as a tribute to Lee who always wears white flowers in her hair during competitions.  She said, "They wore flowers in their hair in honor of me. Just a whole bunch of emotions went through me at that point because it was just amazing to have your teammates support you in that way. It wasn’t verbal support, it was physical. I thought it was an amazing moment, for them to even think of me at their Olympic Games."

Collegiate career 
Lee competed for the UCLA Bruins gymnastics team. She redshirted her freshman year to recover from the knee surgery, and was unable to compete in 2014 due to another knee surgery. In her last meet for UCLA for the 2017 season, she scored her second perfect ten on uneven bars.

Lee was awarded an additional sixth year of NCAA eligibility due to missing two seasons because of her knee surgeries. On hearing the news, Lee said, "Words cannot describe how ecstatic I am to have been given the opportunity to compete another season...I am so thankful that I get to create more memories and bonds with my amazing team and share this last year with the Bruin family."

In 2018, not only did Lee win four regular-season and one post-season perfect tens (four on beam, one on bars) and end the regular season No. 1 on Balance Beam (9.985 RQS) and No. 9 on Uneven Bars (9.940 RQS), but she also won the NCAA Balance Beam title and contributed two perfect tens to help UCLA clinch their seventh national title.

On May 3, 2018, Lee was awarded the prestigious Honda Sports Award. She was named the Co-Pac-12 Conference 2018 Woman of the Year.

Career Perfect 10.0

References

External links
 Peng Peng Lee on Twitter
 Peng Peng Lee at Gymnastics Canada
 Peng Peng Lee at Fédération Internationale de Gymnastique

1993 births
Living people
Canadian female artistic gymnasts
Canadian people of Chinese descent
Gymnasts at the 2007 Pan American Games
Gymnasts at the 2011 Pan American Games
Gymnasts from Toronto
Pan American Games bronze medalists for Canada
Pan American Games medalists in gymnastics
Pan American Games silver medalists for Canada
Sportspeople from Scarborough, Toronto
UCLA Bruins women's gymnasts
Medalists at the 2011 Pan American Games
NCAA gymnasts who have scored a perfect 10
20th-century Canadian women
21st-century Canadian women